Kyrgyzstan competed in the Summer Olympic Games as an independent nation for the first time at the 1996 Summer Olympics in Atlanta, United States.  Previously, Kyrgyz athletes had competed for the Unified Team at the 1992 Summer Olympics.

Results by event

Athletics
Men's 100 metres
Vladislav Chernobay

Men's 800 metres
Boris Kaveshnikov

Men's Marathon
 Nazirdin Akilbekov — 2:23:59 (→ 63rd place)

Men's 110 metres Hurdles
Yevgeny Shorokhov

Men's Triple Jump
Maksim Smetanin

Women's Marathon
 Irina Bogachova — 2:35.44 (→ 21st place)

Boxing
Men's Lightweight (– 60 kg)
Sergey Kopenkin
First Round — Defeated Cristian Giantomassi (Italy), 12-11 
Second Round — Lost to Leonard Doroftei (Romania), 1-10

Men's Welterweight (– 67 kg)
Nourbek Kassenov
First Round — Defeated Shane Heaps (Tonga), 11-2 
Second Round — Lost to Nariman Atayev (Uzbekistan), 7-11

Men's Heavyweight (– 91 kg)
Andrey Kurnyavka
First Round — Lost to Félix Savón (Cuba), 3-9

Canoeing
Men's Kayak Doubles (500 metres)
Andrey Mitkovets
Yury Ulyachenko

Men's Kayak Doubles (1,000 metres)
Andrey Mitkovets and Yury Ulyachenko

Cycling

Track Competition
Men's Points Race
 Yevgeny Vakker
 Final — 1 point (→ 16th place)

Judo
Men's Heavyweight
 Vadim Sergeyev

Women's Extra-Lightweight
 Nataliya Kuligina

Modern Pentathlon
Men's Competition
 Igor Feldman – 4547 points (→ 30th place)

Shooting
Men's Air Pistol, 10 metres
Yury Melentyev

Men's Free Pistol, 50 metres
Yury Melentyev

Men's Air Rifle, 10 metres
Yury Lomov

Men's Small-Bore Rifle, Three Positions, 50 metres
Yury Lomov

Men's Small-Bore Rifle, Prone, 50 metres
Yury Lomov

Swimming
Men's 100m Freestyle
 Sergey Ashikhmin
 Heat — 51.07 (→ did not advance, 29th place)

Men's 400m Freestyle
 Andrey Kvasov
 Heat — 4:00.69 (→ did not advance, 26th place)

Men's 200m Butterfly
 Konstantin Andriuchine
 Heat — 2:01.59 (→ did not advance, 26th place)

Men's 4 × 100 m Freestyle Relay
 Sergey Ashikhmin, Andrey Kvasov, Dmitri Lapine, and Vitaliy Vasilev 
 Heat — 3:30.62 (→ did not advance, 18th place)

Men's 4 × 200 m Freestyle Relay
 Sergey Ashikhmin, Andrey Kvasov, Dmitri Lapine, and Vitaliy Vasilev 
 Heat — 8:00.00 (→ did not advance, 17th place)

Men's 4 × 100 m Medley Relay
 Konstantin Priahin, Evgeni Petrachov, Konstantin Andriuchine, and Sergey Ashikhmin 
 Heat — 3:56.24 (→ did not advance, 21st place)

Women's 4 × 200 m Freestyle Relay
 Viktoria Polejaeva, Olga Titova, Olga Korotaeva, and Olga Bogatyreva 
 Heat — 8:45.76 (→ did not advance, 20th place)

Wrestling
Men's Greco-Roman Middleweight
 Raatbek Sanatbayev

Men's Freestyle Light-Flyweight
 Vladimir Torgovkin

Men's Freestyle Heavyweight
 Konstantin Aleksandrov

Men's Freestyle Super-Heavyweight
 Aleksandr Kovalevsky

References
Official Olympic Reports
sports-reference

Nations at the 1996 Summer Olympics
1996
1996 in Kyrgyzstani sport